
Gmina Zalewo is an urban-rural gmina (administrative district) in Iława County, Warmian-Masurian Voivodeship, in northern Poland.

The gmina contains part of the protected area called Iława Lake District Landscape Park.

Villages
Apart from the town of Zalewo, Gmina Zalewo contains the villages and settlements of Bądki, Bajdy, Barty, Bednarzówka, Boreczno, Brzeziniak, Bukowiec, Dajny, Dobrzyki, Duba, Gajdy, Girgajny, Gubławki, Huta Wielka, Janiki Małe, Janiki Wielkie, Jaśkowo, Jerzwałd, Jezierce, Karpowo, Kiemiany, Kupin, Likszany, Matyty, Mazanki, Międzychód, Mozgowo, Murawki, Nowe Chmielówko, Piekło, Polajny, Półwieś, Pomielin, Pozorty, Rąbity, Rucewo, Rudnia, Sadławki, Skitławki, Śliwa, Surbajny, Tarpno, Urowo, Wielowieś, Wieprz, Witoszewo and Zatyki.

Neighbouring gminas
Gmina Zalewo is bordered by the gminas of Iława, Małdyty, Miłomłyn, Stary Dzierzgoń and Susz.

References
Polish official population figures 2006

Zalewo
Iława County